Ivon Hitchens (born London, 3 March 1893 – 29 August 1979) was an English painter who started exhibiting during the 1920s. He became part of the 'London Group' of artists and exhibited with them during the 1930s. His house was bombed in 1940 during World War II. Hitchens and his family abandoned London for the Sussex countryside, where he acquired a small area of woodland on Lavington Common (near Petworth), and lived there in a caravan, which he gradually augmented with a series of buildings. It was here that the artist further developed his fascination with the woodland subject matter, and this pre-occupation continued until the artist's death in 1979.

Hitchens is particularly well known for panoramic landscape paintings created from blocks of colour. There is a huge mural by him in the main hall of Cecil Sharp House. His work was exhibited in the British Pavilion at the Venice Biennale in 1956.

Hitchens was the son of the artist Alfred Hitchens. His son John Hitchens and grandson Simon Hitchens are both artists.

Exhibitions
 1925  One-man exhibition, Mayor Gallery, London
 1928  Arthur Tooth & Sons, London
 1929  London Artists' Association, Cooling Galleries, London
 1930  Heal's Mansard Gallery, London
 1933  Alex Reid & Lefevre, London (also 1935 and 1937)
 1934  Participated in Objective Abstractions, Zwemmer Gallery
 1937  Storran Gallery exhibition 
 1940  First of ten one-man exhibitions, Leicester Galleries (also in 1942, 1944, 1947, 1949, 1950, 1952, 1954, 1957 and 1959)
 1945  Retrospective exhibition, Temple Newsam House, Leeds
 1947  Friends of Bristol Art Gallery
 1947  Arts Council exhibition Glastonbury and Cirencester  
 1948  Retrospective exhibition, Graves Art Gallery, Sheffield
 1951  Festival of Britain exhibition Bristol Art Gallery
 1953  Metropolitan Art Gallery, Tokyo
 1956  Gimpel Fils, London
 1956  Represented Britain at the XXVIII Venice Biennale
 1958  Laing Art Galleries, Toronto
 1960  One man exhibition, Waddington Galleries, London (also in 1962, 1964, 1966, 1968, 1969, 1971, 1973, 1976, 1982, 1985, 1990, 1993 and 1996)
 1963  Major retrospective exhibition arranged by the Arts Council, Tate Gallery, London
 1964  Civic Art Gallery, Southampton, University of Southampton Arts Festival
 1966  Tib Lane Gallery, Manchester, Poindexter Gallery, New York; Worthing Art Gallery
 1967  Treasures from West Country exhibition, Bristol City Art Gallery
 1967  Stone Gallery, Newcastle
 1971  Basil Jacobs Fine Art, London
 1972  Rutland Gallery, London, Landscape into Abstract
 1978  Burstow Gallery, Brighton College
 1978  Retrospective exhibition, Towner Art Gallery, Eastbourne
 1979  Retrospective exhibition, Royal Academy
 1980  Bohun Gallery, Henley-on-Thames
 1982  New Art Centre, London
 1987  Oriel 31, Welshpool and Newtown, Powys
 1989  Retrospective exhibition, Serpentine Gallery, London
 1991  Cleveland Bridge Gallery, Bath
 1993  Bernard Jacobson Gallery, London
 1993  Pallant House Gallery, Chichester
 1993  Abbot Hall Art Gallery, Kendal
 2000  Jonathan Clark Fine Art, London, A Visual Sound
 2003  Jonathan Clark Fine Art, London, Landscapes
 2005  Towner Art Gallery, Eastbourne
 2005  Jonathan Clark Fine Art, Nudes
 2007  Pallant House Gallery, Chichester
 2007  Jonathan Clark Fine Art, London, The Flower Paintings
 2009  Jonathan Clark Fine Art, London, Unseen Paintings from the 1930s
 2019  Garden Museum, London
 2019  'Space Through Colour': Pallant House Gallery, Chichester; then Djanogly Gallery, Lakeside Arts, University of Nottingham

Sources
Art Fact

External links
 
Tate Britain, London

1893 births
1979 deaths
English artists
People educated at Bedales School
Rother Valley artists